The Division of Paterson is an Australian electoral division in the state of New South Wales. It is located just north of Newcastle, on the coast of the Tasman Sea. The division is named after federation-era poet and author Banjo Paterson and was originally created in 1949 and abolished in 1984. It was recreated after a redistribution in 1992.

The division is centred on the lower Hunter Valley and the outer suburbs of Greater Newcastle. It includes the city of Maitland and the towns of Kurri Kurri, Nelson Bay, Raymond Terrace and Salamander Bay. It covers most of the Port Stephens, and Maitland local government areas along with a small outer part of the City of Newcastle and parts of the northern end of the City of Cessnock.

Geography
Since 1984, federal electoral division boundaries in Australia have been determined at redistributions by a redistribution committee appointed by the Australian Electoral Commission. Redistributions occur for the boundaries of divisions in a particular state, and they occur every seven years, or sooner if a state's representation entitlement changes or when divisions of a state are malapportioned.

History

Paterson was first created at the redistribution of 11 May 1949. It was named after Banjo Paterson although there is conjecture that it was originally named after Colonel William Paterson who also gave his name to the Paterson River and the town of Paterson, both of which were situated within the electorate. It was first contested at the 1949 election. At the time it included the towns of Singleton, Maitland and Muswellbrook. Redistributions eventually moved the electorate north until it included Gunnedah and Mudgee. This incarnation was held by the conservative parties—Liberal and National—for its entire existence, and for most of that time was safely conservative.  The original electorate was abolished at the 11 October 1984 redistribution.

At the redistribution of 31 January 1992 the electorate was recreated, covering a similar area to the original electorate. It extended from the lower Hunter Valley in the south to the Manning River in the north, and the Great Dividing Range in the west. It included the towns of Forster, Nelson Bay, Raymond Terrace and Paterson.

It was first contested at the 1993 federal election and was narrowly won by Bob Horne (Labor). After 1993 the seat was continuously exchanged between Horne and Liberal Bob Baldwin; the seat changed hands in 1996, in 1998 and again in 2001. During this period both Bobs became so well known that name recognition in the division was often in excess of 90% in private party polling.

Horne did not contest the seat at the 2004 election at which Baldwin comfortably defeated a new Labor candidate, former Port Stephens councillor Giovanna Kozary, to retain the seat for the first time. At the 2007 election, Baldwin narrowly defeated new Labor candidate Jim Arneman, a Health Services Union organiser. Baldwin faced Arneman again in 2010 election and was reelected on a swing of four percent, garnering enough votes to win on the first count. At the 2013 election, Baldwin further consolidated his hold on the seat, again winning enough votes to win on the first count. His nearest competitor was Bay Marshall (Labor).

2015 redistribution

In 2015 the Australian Electoral Commission announced plans to abolish the federation seat of Hunter. Electors in the north of Hunter would have joined the safe National seat of New England. The roughly 40 percent remainder would have become part of Paterson, where the Liberal margin was to be notionally reduced from 9.8 percent to just 0.5 percent as a result.

However, the new map saw Paterson radically reconfigured into a more compact coastal-based seat in the lower Hunter, covering only  – only one-sixth of its previous territory. It also absorbed some territory previously in the Labor strongholds of Hunter and Newcastle.  The new map completely erased the Liberal majority; on its new boundaries, it had a paper-thin notional Labor majority of 0.3 percent. Baldwin opted not to contest the 2016 election.  ABC election analyst Antony Green wrote that even with the knife-edge notional Labor majority, the Liberals would have found it extremely difficult to hold the reconfigured Paterson. Not only had the Liberals lost Baldwin's personal vote, but the Liberals had been late in finding a replacement. The seat was won by the Labor candidate, Meryl Swanson, on a swing of over 10 percent, turning it into a safe Labor seat for the first time in its current incarnation.

Members

Election results

References

External links
 Division of Paterson – Australian Electoral Commission

Electoral divisions of Australia
Constituencies established in 1949
Constituencies disestablished in 1984
Constituencies established in 1993
1949 establishments in Australia
1984 disestablishments in Australia
1993 establishments in Australia
Port Stephens Council
Mid-Coast Council